Lee Seo-won (born February 17, 1997) is a former South Korean actor.

Career
Lee debuted in JTBC television series  in 2015. He initially garnered attention for his portrayal of a college student and Suzy's younger brother in  the melodrama Uncontrollably Fond.

In 2017 he was cast as a main character in the drama The Liar and His Lover. The director of the drama Kim Jin-min predicted Lee could potentially be the next Park Bo-gum and Song Joong-ki who are from the same agency as Lee and would follow their steps. Next, he was cast as an oriental doctor in the medical romance drama Hospital Ship.

Personal life
Lee graduated from high school in 2015. He took a two-year break before entering Sejong University as a film major in 2017.

On November 22, 2018, Lee's agency announced that Lee enlisted in the military on November 20, to fulfill mandatory military service.

Sexual harassment and intimidation charges
On May 16, 2018, news broke that Lee was charged with sexual harassment and threatening a female celebrity with a weapon. Lee was charged and investigated on April 8, before the police sent his case to the prosecution with a recommendation of indictment. According to authorities, Lee was drinking with said female celebrity when he attempted to kiss her and make physical contact, but was rejected. After continuous attempts for physical contact, the victim called her boyfriend to ask for help, which caused Lee to threaten her with a knife. Lee remained silent and continued filming the 2018 television series About Time and program Music Bank for 40 days without informing the production staff that he was under investigation. However, when news broke out, Lee, who was supposed to appear in About Time, was pulled out and his scenes were re-filmed using another actor. He was also removed from his role as the host of Music Bank.

On May 24, 2018, Lee apologized for his actions while visiting the Seoul District Public Prosecutors’ Office for interrogation. On July 12, the first day of trial at the Seoul Eastern District Court, Lee pleaded guilty to charges of sexual harassment and criminal threats. Lee's attorney stated that they acknowledge guilt since Lee's DNA was detected on the victim's ear and he was apprehended by police while holding a knife. However, he also stated that Lee was "unable to remember anything from the incident" and was "not in control of his body due to intoxication", and requested a lenient sentence due to Lee's "diminished mental and physical faculties" cause by intoxication. The second trial, which was on October 6, 2018, was held privately at the request of the victim. During the hearing, one witness, the victim's boyfriend who saw Lee swinging the knife, was called to the stand for testimony and to undergo questioning. The victim testified in court on third trial that was held on October 25. The fourth trial was scheduled for November 22, however, Lee enlisted for his military service and planned to attend his trial through the military court with the status of a soldier. The courts postponed his fourth hearing to be held in January 2019, but the Seoul Eastern District Court transferred the case to the military court on February 27. In the first trial, Lee was sentenced to one year in prison suspended for two years of probation. He has since appealed the sentence and the case is being reviewed in the High Military Court.

Filmography

Film

Television series

Television program

Awards and nominations

References

External links
 Lee Seo-won at Blossom Entertainment

1997 births
Living people
People from Gunsan
South Korean male film actors
South Korean male television actors